Tina Dico (born Tina Dickow Danielsen on 14 October 1977) is a Danish singer-songwriter. She founded her own record label and releases her music independently, enjoying large success with her albums in her home country as well as critical acclaim across Europe. She is inspired by artists such as Tracy Chapman, Bob Dylan and Leonard Cohen.

In Denmark she performs both under her real name, Tina Dickow, and under the adopted name Tina Dico as well.

Background and early life
Dico was born in Åbyhøj in Aarhus. Tina's father, who owned a high-end Hi-Fi stereo system in their basement, introduced her to music while she was still quite young.

Dico's interest in playing music started in 8th grade, when she played in the cover-band Mel. They played a lot of songs by Jimi Hendrix, among other artists. In 10th grade, she attended a boarding school called Sejergaardens Musikefterskole. When she started in high school, she helped form the cover-band Fester Kester, who played at high school parties. At the age of 20 she got a part in the slightly erotic TV-show Karrusel, where she played opposite the 41-year-old Peter Steen and Michael Falch. The show was on Danish TV in 1998. After playing the part, she had a lot of offers for other roles, but since she did not like being typecast as a naïve girl from Jutland, she rejected them all. After high school in 1997 she began at Aarhus University, where she studied comparative religion. However, she soon quit the university to study at The Royal Academy of Music in Aarhus, which she eventually also quit to pursue her dream as a professional singer-songwriter.

In 1998, Tina introduced the other members of the band Fester Kester to a song of her own, and their enthusiasm led them to enter, and win, two talent contests the same year: "Talentspot" on Danish TV2, and "Vi har scenen, har I musikken?" (We've got the stage, do you have the music?) in Aarhus.
The band Tina Dickow and Sheriff was formed in 1998, and later that year the single "Your Waste of Time" was released. It was picked as Song of the Week on Danish National Radio, DR P3, and led to some degree of fame.

After all this success, quite a lot of correspondences with different major record labels began, and the rest of 1999 was spent in endless negotiations without results. The band had an acoustic tour around Denmark and a few concerts with full band in Copenhagen and Aarhus.
A single containing "26 Friends" and "Different" was recorded as a prelude to the annual Scandinavian "Venue" tour, which the band was part of in 2000. They were paired with American singer Sandy Dillon and played concerts in Vega, Copenhagen, and Norway and Sweden.

Music career

Finest Gramophone and Fuel 
Several conversations with established record labels followed after the success with "Your Waste of Time", but Tina Dico was unhappy with the way they intended to market her. Instead she got a loan from a bank, and started her own record label, Finest Gramophone in 2000.
The company's first release was Tina Dico's Fuel in 2001. The response from the critics was modest, but they all saw her big potential as an artist. In 2001, Tina Dico also teamed up with her current manager, Jonathan Morley, at the Spot (music festival) in Aarhus. She signed a four-year contract with Jonathan, and during the 2002 MIDEM-festival in Cannes, France, she signed with British KobAlt Music Publishing.
In 2001, Tina also met Steffen Brandt, who had heard the cover Tina did of his song "Alt Hvad Hun Ville Var at Danse" at a concert in Kerteminde. He got fascinated and was invited to one of her next concerts in Aarhus.

Finest Gramophone went on to sign another Danish act, Love Julie, which released two albums. Tina Dico says that she has no intention of signing future acts, due mostly to time constraints.

England and Notes 
In the beginning of 2002, Tina Dico moved to England in an attempt to escape the cosy atmosphere in Denmark.

In 2002 Tina played her first duo-concerts with Steffen Brandt on Bornholm.
Thanks to her contract with Jonathan Morley, she had the opportunity to step into the English music community, which led to a collaboration with Australian singer Holly Valance on the song "Send My Best" in 2005.

Tina wrote the album Notes during her stay in England, capturing the loneliness and fear of being alone in London.
Notes was written while Tina lived in Richmond and later on Tenter Ground near Brick Lane in London.
Notes was recorded in cooperation with her friend Dennis Ahlgren over two days in June 2003. The critics were very positive this time.
It was meant to be an interlude between Fuel and In the Red, but since it got all this success Notes was released later that year.
Notes won a "Steppeulv" (the Danish music critics award) in the category "Composer of the Year" and a Danish Music Award for "Songwriter of the Year”

She also got a contract with the British producer-duo Zero 7, that at the time also included Sia and Sophie Barker. Tina and Zero 7 wrote and recorded "Home" and "The Space Between", which can be found on the Zero 7 album When It Falls.
A tour consisting of more than 100 dates in Europe, United States and Asia followed and included performances at Glastonbury Festival and Roskilde Festival.
In 2004 Tina released an EP named Far and later that year she did a Danish version of the Leonard Cohen song "Hallelujah" with Steffen Brandt.
The song can be found on the album På Danske Læber which is an album with Danish versions of Cohen-songs.
In the summer of 2004 she joined the Danish "Grøn Koncert"-tour.

In the Red
In 2004 Dico signed an international record deal with Sony England. Recording sessions for her international debut album In the Red began at the end of 2004 with producer Chris Potter. This was the first and last time Dico ever worked with someone other than Dennis Ahlgren, who has helped produce all her other albums. In early 2005, Sony and BMG merged, and the record deal was cancelled. The legal rights to the songs were handed over to Dico, and the album was released in cooperation with the Danish company A:Larm in June 2005. The album got very mixed reviews, but was a commercial success. "Nobody’s Man" and "Warm Sand" received a lot of radio play. In The Red went straight to No. 1 on the Danish album chart in front of prominent names such as U2 and Coldplay.
In January 2006, Dico won the P3 Award and DKK 100.000 which is granted by Danish National Radio P3. The jury said this of Dico's effort: "Courage, self-esteem and talent is required if you want to be yourself and perform your own songs – without over-styled fuss. The winner of the P3 Award certainly possesses these qualities."
In March 2006 Dico won the Danish Music Award for "Singer of the Year." Meanwhile, she released her first live DVD, Live in the Red, which was performed and recorded in Store Vega in Copenhagen.

Count to Ten
In February 2007 Dico recorded the John Lennon song "Working Class Hero" as part of Amnesty International's Global campaign "Make Some Noise." She later performed at an Amnesty event with Yoko Ono on first row.
As part of the P3-award she won in 2006, two weeks recording time in Denmark's Radio's studios followed. The two weeks were spent on recording parts of Dico's album Count to Ten. The rest of Count to Ten was later finished in the Feedback- and Aabyroad studios. The album was ready in July and was released on 3 September. The album got very positive reviews from several Danish media.
Dico won the Gaffa-award in 2007 for "Album of the Year" and "Singer of the Year."

In February 2008, after the success of Count to Ten, Dico played an extensive Danish tour.

The Trilogy
While Count to Ten was recorded, Dico also recorded the EP A Beginning, which later became part of the Trilogy.
In January 2008 Dico and Dennis Ahlgren recorded the second EP, A Detour.
Dico met the Icelandic singer Helgi Jonsson on a tour with Teitur Lassen in May 2008. Jonsson and Dico collaborated on the song "Walls" on the third EP, An Open Ending, which was recorded in summer 2008 by Dico and Ahlgren, in-between festivals.
In summer 2008 Dico and her band played on the Orange Stage at Roskilde Festival—the largest concert and stage she's ever played.
In September 2008, Dico won The Crown Prince And Princess's Award and DKK 500.000. She received it for "having the courage to look the contradictory and difficult parts of existence in the eyes, and for the ability to express it in a very special, life-affirming fashion that many can identify themselves with."
A week after she won the cultural award, the EP collection A Beginning, A Detour, An Open Ending (also known as "The Trilogy") was released. After the release, a large tour around the world with Ahlgren and Jonsson followed.
In 2008 Dico won the Gaffa-award for "Singer of the Year" second year in a row.

The Road to Gävle
In 2009 Dico composed the soundtrack for the Danish film Oldboys. The soundtrack quickly evolved into Dico's sixth album, with her continuing to compose after the initial work on the soundtrack was done. The result was The Road to Gävle which was recorded in Electric Lady Studios in New York City, Jimi Hendrix's old studio. Dico made the release of The Road to Gävle quite special for her fans. Through the website www.pledgemusic.com, a site that raises money for charity, she made it possible for fans to access the album before the general release. Some more personal items, such as handwritten lyrics, were also auctioned off. Dico managed to reach the goal of 3000 pledges within thirty days.
Large parts of The Road to Gävle were written in early 2009 on her three-month stay in Los Angeles and New York.
In 2009 Dico also appeared in the SAS (Scandinavian Airlines System) commercial "As good as home." The commercial featured the Count to Ten song "Open Wide." After it aired, all five of Dico's albums appeared on the Top 100 chart—a first in Danish music history.

At the end of 2009 Dico moved back to Denmark, specifically to Copenhagen.
Dico won the Gaffa-award for "Singer of the Year" a third time in a row in 2009.
In February 2010 Dico won two Robert Awards. She won the award for Best Score, and Best Song for "Rebel Song."

Welcome Back Colour
In the beginning of 2010 Dico performed with Danish pop queen Medina at the TV2 Zulu Awards. Later she was in Bristol to record the song "The Storm That Brought You To Me" for the soundtrack to the blockbuster Clash of the Titans with Massive Attack producer Neil Davidge.
In the same year she was in Iceland to record the song "Welcome Back Colour" with Icelandic singer-songwriter Helgi Jónsson. It was the first single from the album Welcome Back Colour, and received heavy rotation on Danish radio.
In the beginning of June 2010 Dico played four sold-out concerts in Danish Radio's concert hall with Danish National Chamber Orchestra. One of the concerts was aired live.
In summer 2010 she played on "Grøn Koncert" once again with a full band.
In August of the same year she played her biggest solo gig at the opening of Aarhus Festival.

Welcome Back Colour, Dico's seventh studio album, was released in Germany on 24 September 2010 and in Denmark on 27 September 2010. The album was released in early 2011 in the UK and United States. The album, which contains 27 tracks, is a mix of her biggest radio hits, five new songs, and a second disc with new acoustic recordings of new and old songs.

Dico embarked on her biggest tour to date across Denmark and Germany, also playing in a few other European cities, and in February 2011 touring the UK and US.

A Handful of Danish EP

In December 2014 Dico released a six-song digital-only EP entitled En Håndfuld Danske (A Handful of Danish), composed of Danish-language cover versions of other artists’ songs. The songs were chosen by fans in a poll announced in early October 2014 and were first made available free on Spotify on 1 December 2014. The EP became available for sale on iTunes on 12 January 2015.

Awards and achievements
In 2008, she received the Danish Crown Prince Couple's Culture Prize.

In 2005, her album, In The Red rose to No. 1 on the Danish album charts.

Personal life 

Dico married partner and collaborator Helgi Jónsson on 13 July 2014 near Reykjavik, where they live. The couple have three children: a son, Emil, born in July 2012; a daughter, Jósefína, born January 2014; and another son, Theodór, born January 2017.

In the summer of 2013, Dico canceled her Danish winter tour due to her second pregnancy.

Discography

Studio albums

EPs

Live albums

Singles

featured in

Other appearances 
 The 2006 album "Precious Time" by Canadian dance-rock band Euphoria features Tina Dico on vocals in the songs "Blue" and "Sinners and Saints".
Instant Karma: The Amnesty International Campaign to Save Darfur" (2007) Tina Dico (listed as Tina Dickow) cover of Working Class Hero (John Lennon)Side By Side – duets Vol. 1" Award-winning American artist AM (musician) and Tina Dico perform the duet "While My Guitar Gently Weeps" (2008) a cover of a George Harrison song.
 On the soundtrack of the 2010 film Clash of the Titans, Dico performed and co-wrote the song "The Storm That Brought You To Me".
 Tina Dico is listed as both "songwriter" and "featuring" on Helgi Jónsson's 2010' album Big spring
 Tina Dico is featured on the hip hop group Suspekt's album Elektra which was released in September 2011.

Notes

Sources 
 ROSA-article about the release of Fuel
 ROSA-article about moving to England
 ROSA-article about the release of Notes
 Interview with Tina Dico about The Road to Gävle
 Biography from Tina Dico's own page
 GAFFA-price 2007

External links 

Official international page on Facebook
Tina Dico on Twitter
1998 performance "Change Your Mind" on TV 2's Talentspot

1977 births
Danish women singer-songwriters
Living people
Danish emigrants to Iceland
Singers from Aarhus
English-language singers from Denmark
Recipients of the Crown Prince Couple's Culture Prize
Pop rock singers
21st-century Danish women singers
21st-century guitarists
21st-century women guitarists